The Bangladesh Jatiya Samajtantrik Dal is a political party in Bangladesh, led by Sharif Nurul Ambia. The party emerged from a split in the Inu-led Jatiya Samajtantrik Dal in 2016. Sharif Nurul Ambia became the president of the new JSD faction, Moinuddin Khan Badal the executive president and Nazmul Haque Prodhan as general secretary. The party joined the Awami League-led 14-Party Alliance. Ahead of the 2018 Bangladeshi general election, the Awami League allowed the party to field its candidate Moinuddin Khan Badal to contest the Chittagong-8 seat on their election symbol.

References

Political parties in Bangladesh